Mile Nedelkoski (November 25, 1935 – June 21, 2020) was a Macedonian poet, novelist, storyteller, and playwright. In North Macedonia, he had a reputation for being a bulgarophile intellectual.

Biography 
Nedelkoski was born on November 25, 1935 in Prilep. He served as an editor at Kultura press. He became a member of the Macedonian Writers' Society (ДПМ) in 1963. Awards that he received included the Miladinov Brothers Prize, the Kočo Racin Prize, and the Racin Award. Nedelkoski died on June 21, 2020 in Skopje.

Publications 
 Срце од злато (Heart of Gold; poetry, 1963)
 Јужно лето (Southern Year; poetry, 1964)
 Улавиот од Преспа (The Madman from Prespa; poem, 1965)
 Јавачи на ветар (Riders on the Wind; stories, 1967)
 Пепелаши (Ashes; novel, 1968)
 Еретикон-еротикон (Hereticon-Eroticon; poetry, 1969)
 Трненки (Blackthorns; novel, 1972)
 Триумфот на Тројанскиот коњ (Triumph on a Trojan Horse; play in verse, 1974)
 Пандур (The Pandur; novel, 1982)
 Враќање во арената на стариот прославен, заслужен и ислужен кловн и Пропаста на Олимп (An Old Celebrated Worthy and Weary Clown's Return to the Arena and the Decline of Olympus; plays in verse, 1983)
 Недела ден за каење (Sunday, Day for Repentance; poetry, 1984)
 Битпазар стилски вежби, ете... (poetry, 1984)
 Прозорец што гледа на улица (A Window with a View of the Street)
 Преспански круг со црвена боја и На крепоста чувари (plays, 1985)
 Потковица на смртта и надежта (A Horseshoe of Death and Hope; novel, 1986)
 Петрафил за вечната земја (An Epitrachelion for the Eternal Earth; novel, 1988)
 Подгревање на вчерашниот ручек (Warming Up Yesterday's Lunch; novel, 1988)
 Огледала на сенките (Mirrors of Shadows; poetry, 1989)
 Создателот и старата емигрантка - продавачка на разни плодови (The Creator and the Old Emigrant—A Seller of Various Fruit; novel, 1991)
 Логоманија (Logomania; essays, 1996)
 Празникот на светите маченици (The Feast of the Holy Martyrs; novel, 1996).

Notes 

1935 births
2020 deaths
Macedonian writers
People from Prilep